The 1998 U.S. Women's Open was the 53rd edition of the U.S. Women's Open, held  July 2–6 at Blackwolf Run in Kohler, Wisconsin.

The champion was Se Ri Pak, the winner of a 20-hole Monday playoff over amateur Jenny Chuasiriporn. Both age 20, Pak and Chuasiriporn finished the 18-hole playoff round tied at 73, and both parred the first extra hole, a par-5. Pak rolled in an  birdie putt on the 92nd hole of competition to become the youngest woman to win two major championships in the same year. She won her first major, the LPGA Championship, seven weeks earlier.

On the 72nd hole on Sunday, Chuasiriporn holed a  birdie putt to get into the playoff.  Pak later had an  birdie putt to win the title outright, but it did not drop. Pak was awarded the winner's share of the prize money on Sunday, prior to the playoff, as Chuasiriporn was an amateur.

The championship returned to the course fourteen years later, in 2012.

Course layout

Source:
"Original Course" used the back nine from Meadow Valleys for its front nine, and the first four and final five holes from River for its back nine.

Past champions in the field

Made the cut

Source:

Missed the cut

Source:

Round summaries

First round
Thursday, July 2, 1998

Source:

Second round
Friday, July 3, 1998

Source:

Third round
Saturday, July 4, 1998

Source:

Final round
Sunday, July 5, 1998

Source:

Scorecard

Cumulative tournament scores, relative to par
Source:

Playoff 
Monday, July 6, 1998

Pak and Chuasiriporn tied in the 18-hole playoff at 73 (+2).
The sudden-death playoff began on the back nine:
 Both parred the first hole (#10, par 5)
 Pak (3) birdied the second hole (#11) and Chuasiriporn (x) did not.

Scorecard

Source:

References

External links
Golf Observer final leaderboard
U.S. Women's Open Golf Championship

U.S. Women's Open
Golf in Wisconsin
Sports competitions in Wisconsin
U.S. Women's Open
U.S. Women's Open
U.S. Women's Open
U.S. Women's Open
Women in Wisconsin